Max-Emanuel Ludwig Maria Herzog in Bayern (sometimes styled Prince Max of Bavaria, Duke in Bavaria; born 21 January 1937) as the younger son of Albrecht, Duke of Bavaria, is the heir presumptive to both the headship of the former Bavarian royal house and the Jacobite succession. He was born a Prince of Bavaria, as a member of the royal line of the House of Wittelsbach, but has been using the title "Herzog in Bayern" or Duke in Bavaria, since he was adopted as an adult by his grand-uncle, Duke Ludwig Wilhelm in Bavaria, the last bearer of that title of a junior branch of the House of Wittelsbach, from whom he inherited considerable estates at Tegernsee Abbey (including a brewery), Banz Abbey and Kreuth.

Family
Max married the Swedish Countess Elisabeth Douglas (born 31 December 1940 in Stockholm), daughter of Count Carl Ludvig Douglas (Swedish Ambassador to Brazil) and Ottora Maria Haas-Heye, in a civil ceremony in Kreuth on 10 January 1967 and in a religious ceremony in Munich on 24 January 1967. His wife is also a granddaughter of General Archibald Douglas and a great-granddaughter of Philipp, Prince of Eulenburg.

They have five daughters:
Duchess Sophie Elizabeth Marie Gabrielle in Bavaria (born 28 October 1967 in Munich), married on 3 July 1993 in Vaduz, Hereditary Prince Alois of Liechtenstein (born 11 June 1968 in Zürich), son of Hans-Adam II, Prince of Liechtenstein, and Countess Marie Aglaë Kinsky of Wchinitz and Tettau. They have four children.
Duchess Marie-Caroline Hedwig Eleonore in Bavaria (born 23 June 1969 in Munich), married on 27 July 1991 in Tegernsee, Duke Philipp of Württemberg (born 1 November 1964 in Friedrichshafen), son of Carl, Duke of Württemberg, and Princess Diane of Orléans. They have four children.
Duchess Helena Eugenie Maria Donatha Mechthild in Bavaria (born 6 May 1972 in Munich)
Duchess Elisabeth Marie Christine Franziska in Bavaria (born 4 October 1973 in Munich), married on 25 September 2004 in Munich, Daniel Terberger (born 11 June 1967 in Bielefeld), CEO of German textile company KATAG AG. They have two children.
Duchess Maria Anna Henriette Gabrielle Julie in Bavaria (born 7 May 1975 in Munich), firstly married on 8 September 2007 in Munich, Klaus Runow (born 3 July 1964 in Duisburg), an investment banker. Their divorce was announced in early 2015. Maria-Anna secondly married on 16 October 2015, Baron Andreas von Maltzahn. She has two sons from her first marriage.

Max and Elisabeth live in Schloss Wildenwart and Tegernsee Abbey.

Patronages
 Member of the Board of Trustees of the Technical University of Munich.
 Member of the Board of Trustees of the Friends of the Pinakothek der Moderne (the modern art museum in Munich).
 Member of the Board of Directors of TAG Tegernseebahn Immobilien- und Beteiligungs Aktiengesellschaft (a real estate corporation centred in the Tegernsee Valley).
 President of the Chiemgau Golf Club (since 1987).
 President of the Wittelsbacher Golf Club in Rohrenfeld-Neuburg.

Honours
 Coadjutor, Grand Master and First Grand Prior of the Royal Order of Saint George for the Defense of the Immaculate Conception
 Knight of the Order of Saint Hubert
 Knight of Honour of the Teutonic Order
 Recipient of the 70th Birthday Badge Medal of King Carl XVI Gustaf (30 April 2016)

Ancestry

References 

|-

|-

|-

Princes of Bavaria
Dukes in Bavaria
House of Wittelsbach
German people of Croatian descent
German Roman Catholics
1937 births
Living people
Dachau concentration camp survivors
Adult adoptees